Gaia is a 2018 inflatable installation artwork by Luke Jerram. Several copies tour the world for temporary exhibitions, often accompanied by music, with copies in the colleections of several public museums. 

The sphere is lit internally when installed in a dark place, to create a glowing floating orb.

Gaia was first shown the Bluedot Festival at Jodrell Bank in Cheshire in 2018.  An example was shown at the COP26 meeting in Glasgow in 2021.

The work has been compared to The Blue Marble, the 1972 photograph of the Earth by astronauts from Apollo 17.  Its physical impact is said to create a form of overview effect in some observers. 

References
 Gaia website
 Science Museum
 Moon artist Luke Jerram unveils giant Earth sculpture, BBC News, 20 July 2018

2018 works
Installation art works
Installation art works by Luke Jerram